"No Romeo No Juliet" is a hip-hop song by American rapper 50 Cent. It was released for download on May 11, 2016 as the lead single from 50 Cent's yet-to-be-released twelfth mixtape, Kanan Reloaded (originally planned for released in 2016). The song was produced by Arthur McArthur and features vocals American singer Chris Brown.

Music video
On June 22, 2016, 50 Cent uploaded the music video for "No Romeo No Juliet" on his YouTube account. The end of the video features the preview from music video "Tryna Fuck Me Over".

Charts

Release history

References 

2016 singles
2016 songs
50 Cent songs
Chris Brown songs
Songs written by 50 Cent
Songs written by Chris Brown